Dennis Esteban Dominguez Baldivia (born February 9, 1962), popularly known as Dennis Padilla, is a Filipino comedian, TV host, radio broadcaster and actor. He is the son of the late Dencio Padilla, and the father of actress Julia Barretto. He was a Caloocan city councilor in 2001.

He was elected councilor of Caloocan from 1998 to 2007. In the 2013 elections, he ran for Board Member in his home province, Laguna but lost. His partymates in the 3rd district includes actress and incumbent board member Angelica Jones, (former ABS-CBN) journalist Sol Aragones, first term congresswoman (Legislative District Representative), and ER Ejercito, the incumbent governor of Laguna.

In 2017, Padilla was appointed as one of the board members of the Movie and Television Review and Classification Board (MTRCB).

Filmography

Film
Nardong Kutsero (1969)
Asedillo (1971)
Totoy Bato (1977)
Anak ni Waray vs Anak ni Biday (1984) Fundraiser
Taray at Teroy (1988)
Wanted: Pamilya Banal (1989)
Michael and Madonna (1990)
Humanap Ka ng Panget (1990)
Shake, Rattle & Roll II ("Kulam" segment; 1990) - Living dead
Robin Good: Sugod ng Sugod (1991)
Pitong Gamol (1991) Pepeng
Ang Utol Kong Hoodlum (1991) - Mel
Kaputol ng Isang Awit (1991) - Nonong
Maging Sino Ka Man (1991) - Lebag
Andrew Ford Medina: 'Wag Kang Gamol! (1991)
Onyong Majikero (1991) - Gabriel
Darna (1991)
Bad Boy II (1992) - Kamote
Grease Gun Gang (1992) - Panyong Libog
Blue Jeans Gang (1992)
Mandurugas (1992) Binoy
Miss Na Miss Kita: Utol Kong Hoodlum II (1992) Mel
Alabang Girls (1992) Arthor
Mahirap Maging Pogi (1992)
Row 4: Ang Baliktorians (1993) Arnulfo "Aruy" Gonzales
Astig (1993) Terio
Makuha Ka sa Tingin: Kung Puede Lang (1993) Tembong
Pusoy Dos (1994)
Pintsik (1994) Mando
Kalabog en Bosyo (1994) kalabog
Cuadro de Jack (1994) Janggo
Ang Tipo Kong Lalake: Maginoo Pero Medyo Bastos (1995) Stevan "Junior" Cruz Jr.
Cara y Cruz: Walang Sinasanto! (1996) Bogard
A E I O U (1996) Father (uncredited)
Pablik Enemi 1 n 2: Aksidental Heroes (1997) Sergio
Si Mokong, si Astig at si Gamol (1997) Astig
Takot Ako sa Darling Ko! (1997) Angel
Alamid: Ang Alamat (1998)
Alipin ng Aliw (1998)
Bilib Ako sa Iyo (1999) Lukas
Pepeng Agimat (1999) Capt. Rustico 'Tikboy' Purgana
Pedro Penduko, Episode II: The Return of the Comeback (2000) Bulag
Basta Tricycle Driver ... Sweet Lover (2000)
Minsan Ko Lang Sasabihin (2000) Goyo
Akala Mo ... (2002) Jun
Ang Tanging Ina (2003) Eddie
Asboobs: Asal Bobo (2003)
Can This Be Love (2005) Tiyo Dodie
D' Anothers (2005) Mr. Resureccion
Binibining K (2006) Adrin
My Only Ü (2008)
Noy (2010)
I Do (2010)
Ang Tanging Ina Mo (Last na 'To!) (2010)
Who's That Girl? (2011)
The Unkabogable Praybeyt Benjamin (2011)
Manila Kingpin: The Asiong Salonga Story (2011)
Moron 5 and the Crying Lady (2012)
Shake, Rattle and Roll Fourteen: The Invasion (2012)
El Presidente (December 25, 2012)
Ang Maestra (2013)
Raketeros (2013) Heaven's Best Entertainment & Star Cinema
Sa Ngalan ng Ama, Ina, at mga Anak (2014) Wason
Bride for Rent (2014)
Echosherang Frog (2014)
Maybe This Time (2014)
Mariquina (2014)
Praybeyt Benjamin 2 (2014)
The Breakup Playlist (2015)
Fruits N' Vegetables: Mga Bulakboleros (2016) Professor at the Science Lab (U.P. Campus-Diliman)
Can't Help Falling in Love (2017)
Sanggano't Sanggago't Sanggwapo (2019)
Pakboys Takusa (2020)
Sanggano, Sanggago’t Sanggwapo 2: Aussie! Aussie (O Sige) (2021)

Television

Radio shows
Eat All You Can (104.7 Brigada News FM, formerly DZXL 558 kHz)

References

External links

1962 births
Living people
Duterte administration personnel
Filipino actor-politicians
Filipino male comedians
Filipino male child actors
Filipino male film actors
Filipino male television actors
Male actors from Metro Manila
Metro Manila city and municipal councilors
Notre Dame Educational Association alumni
People from Caloocan
GMA Network personalities
ABS-CBN personalities
TV5 (Philippine TV network) personalities